Nizhnyaya Kurmaza (Tübänge Körmäźe) is a rural locality (a village) in Yelbulaktamaksky Selsoviet, Bizhbulyaksky District, Bashkortostan, Russia. The population was 17 as of 2010. There is 1 street.

Geography 
Nizhnyaya Kurmaza is located 19 km south of Bizhbulyak (the district's administrative centre) by road. Antonovka is the nearest rural locality.

References 

Rural localities in Bizhbulyaksky District